The 2016–17 UEFA Futsal Cup was the 31st edition of Europe's premier club futsal tournament. This was the 16th edition under the current UEFA Futsal Cup format organized by UEFA.

In the final, Inter FS defeated Sporting CP to win their fourth title. Kairat Almaty defeated Ugra Yugorsk, who were the defending champions, to finish third.

Teams
A total of 52 teams from 51 of the 55 UEFA member associations entered the tournament, which was a record number of entries and included first-time entrants from Kosovo and San Marino. Each association could enter one team, the winners of their regular top domestic futsal league (or in special circumstances, the runners-up). Moreover, the winners of the 2015–16 UEFA Futsal Cup qualified automatically as title holders, and thus their association could enter a second team.

Teams were ranked according to their UEFA coefficients, computed based on results of the last three seasons, to decide on the round they entered. The top four teams (with the title holders being the automatic top seed) entered the elite round, the next 16 teams (ranked 5–20) entered the main round, and the bottom 32 teams (ranked 21–52) entered the preliminary round.

For teams entering the preliminary round or main round, they were assigned a seeding position according to their ranking for the respective draw, with eight teams pre-selected as hosts for the preliminary round and six teams pre-selected as hosts for the main round (marked by (H) below).

The draws for the preliminary round and main round were held on 7 July 2016, 14:00 CEST (UTC+2), at the UEFA headquarters in Nyon, Switzerland. The mechanism of the draws for each round was as follows:
In the preliminary round, the 32 teams were drawn into eight groups of four containing one team from each of the seeding positions 1–4. First, the eight teams which were pre-selected as hosts were drawn from their own designated pot and allocated to their respective group as per their seeding positions. Next, the remaining 24 teams were drawn from their respective pot which were allocated according to their seeding positions.
In the main round, the 24 teams were drawn into six groups of four, either containing one team from each of the seeding positions 1–3 and one group winner from the preliminary round, or containing one team from each of the seeding positions 1–2 and two group winners from the preliminary round. First, the six teams which were pre-selected as hosts were drawn from their own designated pot and allocated to their respective group as per their seeding positions. Next, the remaining 18 teams (including the eight preliminary round winners, whose identity was not known at the time of the draw) were drawn from their respective pot which were allocated according to their seeding positions.

Based on the decisions taken by the UEFA Emergency Panel, teams from Azerbaijan/Armenia, Kosovo/Serbia, and Kosovo/Bosnia and Herzegovina would not be drawn into the same group. Should any of the above teams win their preliminary round group and qualify for a main round group with a team they cannot play against, they would be swapped with the next available team in their seeding position following the alphabetical order of the groups.

Round and draw dates
The schedule of the competition is as follows.

Format
In the preliminary round, main round and elite round, each group is played as a round-robin mini-tournament at the pre-selected hosts.

In the final tournament, the four qualified teams play in knockout format (semi-finals, third place match, and final), either at a host selected by UEFA from one of the teams, or at a neutral venue.

Tiebreakers
In the preliminary round, main round and elite round, the teams are ranked according to points (3 points for a win, 1 point for a draw, 0 points for a loss). If two or more teams are equal on points on completion of a mini-tournament, the following tie-breaking criteria are applied, in the order given, to determine the rankings (regulations Articles 14.01 and 14.02):
Higher number of points obtained in the mini-tournament matches played among the teams in question;
Superior goal difference resulting from the mini-tournament matches played among the teams in question;
Higher number of goals scored in the mini-tournament matches played among the teams in question;
If, after having applied criteria 1 to 3, teams still have an equal ranking, criteria 1 to 3 are reapplied exclusively to the mini-tournament matches between the teams in question to determine their final rankings. If this procedure does not lead to a decision, criteria 5 to 10 apply;
Superior goal difference in all mini-tournament matches;
Higher number of goals scored in all mini-tournament matches;
If only two teams have the same number of points, and they are tied according to criteria 1 to 6 after having met in the last round of the mini-tournament, their rankings are determined by a penalty shoot-out (not used if more than two teams had the same number of points, or if their rankings are not relevant for qualification for the next stage).
Lower disciplinary points total based only on yellow and red cards received in the mini-tournament matches (red card = 3 points, yellow card = 1 point, expulsion for two yellow cards in one match = 3 points);
Coefficient ranking;
Drawing of lots.

Preliminary round
The eight group winners advanced to the main round to join the 16 teams which received byes to the main round.

All times were CEST (UTC+2).

Group A

Group B

Group C

Group D

Group E

Group F

Group G

Group H

Main round
The six group winners and the six group runners-up advanced to the elite round to join the four teams which received byes to the elite round.

All times were CEST (UTC+2).

Group 1

Group 2

Group 3

Group 4

Group 5

Group 6

Elite round
The draw for the elite round was held on 21 October 2016, 13:30 CEST (UTC+2), at the UEFA headquarters in Nyon, Switzerland. The 16 teams were drawn into four groups of four, containing one team which received byes to the elite round, and either two group winners and one group runner-up from the main round, or one group winner and two group runners-up from the main round. First, the four teams which were pre-selected as hosts (marked by (H) below) were drawn from their own designated pot and allocated to their respective group as per their seeding positions. Next, the remaining 12 teams were drawn from their respective pot which were allocated according to their seeding positions. Teams from the same main round group could not be drawn in the same group. Based on the decisions taken by the UEFA Emergency Panel, FC Feniks (Kosovo) and Ekonomac (Serbia) could not have been drawn into the same group.

The four group winners advanced to the final tournament.

All times were CET (UTC+1).

Group A

Group B

Group C

Group D

Final tournament
The hosts of the final tournament was selected by UEFA from the four qualified teams, with UEFA announcing on 9 December 2016 that it would be hosted by Kairat Almaty at the Almaty Arena, in Almaty, Kazakhstan.

The draw for the final tournament was held on 4 March 2017, 15:45 ALMT (UTC+6), at the Almaty Central Stadium in Almaty, during half-time of the 2017 Kazakhstan Super Cup. The four teams were drawn into two semi-finals without any restrictions.

In the final tournament, extra time and penalty shoot-out would be used to decide the winner if necessary; however, no extra time would be used in the third place match.

Bracket

All times are CEST (UTC+2); local times, ALMT (UTC+6), are in parentheses.

Semi-finals

Third place match

Final

Top goalscorers

References

External links
2016–17 UEFA Futsal Cup
European league standings

2016-17
Cup